Joy of Life, also known as Thankful for the Remaining Years, is a 2019 Chinese television series that is based on the novel Qing Yunian by Mao Ni. It stars Zhang Ruoyun, Li Qin and Chen Daoming.
The series premiered on Tencent Video and iQiyi on November 26, 2019. It garnered high viewership and mostly positive reviews, and won two awards at the Shanghai Television Festival, including Best Adapted Screenplay.

Plot
Fan Xian is born in the ancient empire of Southern Qing with memories of the 21st century. He is raised by his grandmother in the rural town, Danzhou as the illegitimate son of the Minister of Finance. His mother, Ye Qingmei was once a celebrated inventor who founded the Overwatch Department, the country's spy network and the Royal Treasury but was killed shortly after her son was born. Fan Xian has since been protected by a blind martial arts expert, Wu Zhu, his mother's bodyguard. He learns martial arts and the art of poison as a child, also assisted by his knowledge from the 21st century. After an assassination attempt, he decides to venture into the capital to find out more about his mysterious mother and why anyone would want to kill him, as he perceives himself to be an unimportant person. He also wants to know why he has memories of an obviously different era. In the capital, he accidentally meets Lin Wan'er, the sickly illegitimate daughter of the Princess Royal and falls in love with her. Unbeknownst to him, she is the woman the Emperor chose for him to marry so that he could overtake the Royal Treasury, an institute Fan Xian's mother established in the palace and currently handled by the Princess Royal. In the capital, however, he gets entangled in the relationship between the Emperor and the two Princes, as well as the Overwatch Department, leading to him questioning his whole identity and motivating him to find his true life goals, abandoning his original intention to just "enjoy life".

Cast

Main

Supporting

Southern Qing Empire

Imperial palace

Imperial court

Overwatch Department

Fan's family and household

Others

Northern Qi Empire

Production
Principal photography commenced in January 2018 and the entire filming wrapped up in August 2018. A second season was announced in 2020, while Tencent Pictures, Xinli Media and China Reading Film and Television later announced the project would go live in the fourth quarter of 2021. In October 2021, Disney announced that they would be involved in producing the second season of Joy of Life with New Classics Media, and that this season would be a prequel to the first season.

Reception
The drama received positive reviews for its skillful adaptation of the original novel, comedic elements and logical story flow. It also received praise for its cinematography, acting performance, special effects and action scenes; as well as its tight plot and interesting storyline. It achieved more than 13 billion combined views on Tencent Video and iQiyi, and received 8 out of 10 stars on Douban. International streaming site Viki gave it a 9.6 rating out of 10 with over 5000 reviews in 2021.

Awards and nominations

Soundtrack

Mainland China

Hong Kong

Taiwan

International broadcast

References

2019 Chinese television series debuts
Chinese historical television series
Chinese web series
IQIYI original programming
Television shows based on Chinese novels
Television series by New Classics Media
Television series by Tencent Pictures
Tencent original programming
2020 Chinese television series endings